Alexandre Bultos (18 June 1749, Brussels - 20 September 1787) was a Belgian comic actor and theatre director.

Life
The seventh child of Pierre-François Bultos and his wife Marie-Josèphe Lambert, wine merchants and hoteliers, Alexandre made his stage debut in December 1761 aged 12, in La Servante maîtresse by Pierre Baurans, after the work by Pergolesi, beside his close contemporary Angélique D'Hannetaire (like him, a student of Ignaz Vitzthumb, music-master of the Théâtre de la Monnaie).  When this play was reprised two months later, François-Antoine de Chevrier wrote:

From 1767 to 1770 he was part of the Ghent troupe, acted at Strasbourg in 1770, and then acted at Maastricht in Charles Bernardy's troupe, before finally getting to Copenhagen under his own steam.  Taken on at Brussels in 1772 as an ensemble member then as Laruette and his comic leads from 1773, he divided his duties with Dazincourt, which sometimes led to tension between Dazincourt and Bultos.  Dazincourt left Brussels for Paris in 1776, leaving Bultos alone to fill the lead roles. In 1777 Bultos and his father obtained permission to open a Vauxhall in the Parc de Bruxelles and the same year Alexandre became co-director of the Théâtre de la Monnaie alongside Louis-Jean Pin.  Five years later, he made his brother Herman (1752-1801) his co-director.  Around 1785 he tried to make a debut at the Comédie-Française but was dissuaded by his contemporaries.

References 
 Henri Liebrecht: Histoire du Theatre Français. Slatkine Reprints. Genève 1977. p. 353-355. 

1749 births
1787 deaths
Belgian male actors
Directors of La Monnaie
Actors of the Austrian Netherlands